Platinum Tower is a highrise residential building in Beirut, Lebanon. It occupies a large plot on the Zaitunay Bay Marina, at Saint George Bay in the Beirut Central District.

Location 
The platinum tower has occupied a significant location on the seafront. It is also considered to be an inflated eye-sore by many citizens of the city as it also representative of a violent contemporary gentrification moment. The tower neighbors several luxurious hotels like the InterContinental Phoenicia Beirut Hotel, the Monroe Hotel, Le Vendôme Intercontinental Hotel, Grand Hyatt and the Four Seasons Hotel. It is also adjacent to several landmarks including the Rafik Hariri memorial, the St. Elias Cathedral, the Corniche Beirut, All Saints Church, Beirut International Exhibition & Leisure Center, and the bullet-riddled Holiday Inn Hotel, one of the last witnesses to Beirut's destructive civil war.

Project 
The Platinum Tower consists of two single buildings, the smaller one at the sea side, the lower one overlooking the Beirut Central District. This building was a 'Hourie Development' project, designed by Nabil Gholam Architects in association with Ricardo Bofill Taller de Arquitectura. It was completed in 2008, one year behind its expected completion date. It held the status of the tallest building in Lebanon at 153 meters until 2014 when it was eclipsed by the more inconsiderate 180-meter-high Sky Gate tower in the Achrafieh district of Beirut. Below the tower, five levels are reserved a car park. A pedestrian bridge connecting the building to the marina is planned for future construction.

Light 
The house is illuminated at night at its edges, and on top, additionally with horizontal light lines at every ninth floor.

Image gallery

See also
 List of tallest buildings in Lebanon

References

External links 

 Official site of Platinum Tower

Ricardo Bofill buildings
Buildings and structures in Beirut
Residential buildings completed in 2008
2008 establishments in Lebanon